Antonio Cerdá (10 December 1921 – 28 November 2010) was an Argentine professional golfer.

Cerdá finished second in the 1951 Open Championship to Max Faulkner, and second in the 1953 Open Championship to Ben Hogan, among seven consecutive top-ten finishes in the championship. He won several national opens in Europe in the 1950s and won the first Canada Cup with Roberto De Vicenzo in 1953 for Argentina. Later in his career, Cerdá would emigrate to Mexico, and also represented that country five times at the World Cup, finishing third in 1967.

After an outstanding professional career, Cerdá dedicated over 40 years to golf instruction, particularly to young players in Mexico, like his son Antonio Oscar Cerdá.

Professional wins (38)

European wins (8)
1950 Spanish Open
1951 German Open
1952 German Open, Belgian Open, Spalding Tournament (tie with Harry Weetman)
1955 Yorkshire Evening News Tournament
1956 Dutch Open, Italian Open

Argentine wins (23)
1944 Cordoba PGA Championship 
1946 Alta Gracia Tournament 
1948 Argentine Open, Palermo Match Play 
1949 Ranelagh Open 
1950 South Open, Masllorens Grand Prix 
1951 Cirio Grand Prix 
1952 Argentine PGA Championship, Center Open, Jockey Club Grand Prix
1953 Center Open 
1954 Acantilados Grand Prix, Jockey Club Grand Prix, Fernet Branca Grand Prix 
1955 South Open, Center Open 
1956 Argentine Open, Ranelagh Open, Rio Cuarto Open, Western Textil Grand Prix
1957 Rio Cuarto Open, Western Textil Grand Prix (tie with Romulado Barbieri and Fidel de Luca)

Other wins (7)
this list is probably incomplete
1953 Canada Cup (team with Roberto De Vicenzo and individual winner)
1954 Barranquilla Open (Colombia)
1955 Panama Open, Manizalez Tournament (Colombia), Jamaica Open
1958 Mexican Open

Results in major championships

Note: Cerdá only played in the Masters Tournament and The Open Championship.

NT = No tournament
CUT = missed the half-way cut
"T" indicates a tie for a place

Team appearances
World Cup (representing Argentina): 1953 (winners), 1954, 1955, 1957
World Cup (representing Mexico): 1962, 1963, 1965, 1967, 1968

References

Argentine male golfers
Sportspeople from Córdoba Province, Argentina
People from Río Cuarto, Córdoba
1921 births
2010 deaths